Yago Yao Alonso-Fueyo Sako (born 19 August 1979), known as Yago Yao, is a former footballer who played as a central defender.

Yago Yao spent his entire 18-year senior career in Spain, amassing a combined La Liga totals of 43 matches and one goal for Celta (two spells) and Recreativo. He added 123 games in the Segunda División, with Celta as well as four other clubs.

Born in Ivory Coast, Yago Yao represented Spain at under-18 level and Equatorial Guinea at senior level.

Early life
Yago Yao was born in Abidjan, Ivory Coast to an Ivorian mother and a Spanish father. Six hours after his birth he was taxed as Spanish and, three months later, he was taken to live in Asturias where his paternal grandfather was from.

Club career
Yago Yao played solely in Spain during his career, representing Sporting de Gijón (two stints), RC Celta de Vigo (two, being severely injured early into his second), Recreativo de Huelva, Real Oviedo, Cádiz CF and Levante UD. In 2000–01 he appeared in 20 games in La Liga as the Galicians finished sixth, but split the 2002–03 season with two teams that met the same fate, relegation (Recre and Oviedo, one in each of the major levels of Spanish football).

After unsuccessful trials at both Aris Thessaloniki F.C. and Hamilton Academical, Yago Yao returned to Spain in January 2010, signing with modest Montañeros CF in Galicia.

International career
According Yago Yao, one of his grandmothers was from what is now known as Equatorial Guinea. He possessed dual nationality, and went on to represent the Equatorial Guinea national team, his first cap coming in 2007 at age 28 against Cameroon. He previously appeared for Spain at youth level.

In December 2007, Yago Yao played B matches against the Region of Murcia and Extremadura.

References

External links

Celta de Vigo biography 

1979 births
Living people
Footballers from Abidjan
Citizens of Spain through descent
Spanish footballers
Association football central defenders
Sporting de Gijón B players
Sporting de Gijón players
RC Celta de Vigo players
Recreativo de Huelva players
Real Oviedo players
Cádiz CF players
Levante UD footballers
Coruxo FC players
Rápido de Bouzas players
Segunda División B players
Segunda División players
La Liga players
Tercera División players
Spain youth international footballers
Spanish football managers
Spanish people of Ivorian descent
Spanish sportspeople of African descent
Spanish sportspeople of Equatoguinean descent
Citizens of Equatorial Guinea through descent
Equatoguinean footballers
Equatorial Guinea international footballers
Equatoguinean football managers
Equatoguinean sportspeople of Spanish descent
Equatoguinean people of Asturian descent
Equatoguinean people of Ivorian descent